Srdja Pavlović, also Srđa Pavlović, is a Montenegrin and Serbian historian. He was born in Montenegro, and educated in Montenegro, Serbia, Mongolia, Great Britain, and Canada. Specializing in the modern European and Balkan history, his main field of research is political and cultural history of the South Slavs during the 19th and 20th centuries.

Career
He is currently adjunct professor at the Department of History and Classics, University of Alberta, where he is research associate at Wirth Institute for Austrian and Central European Studies. Pavlović specialized in the modern European and Balkan history, with political and cultural history of the South Slavs during the 19th and 20th centuries being his main field of research. Previously, he also taught at Grant MacEwan University, and at the Portage College. Beside his college and university teachings, Pavlović is also a researcher, supervisor, editor, and literary translator.

He co-founded Spaces of Identity, where he works as co-editor. This is a multidisciplinary international web-journal dedicated to issues of tradition, cultural boundaries and identity formation in Central and Eastern Europe. He is also an associate editor of Nationality Papers at Columbia University, and Treaties and Documents at University of Maribor.

Pavlović is coordinator of the research projects Direct Democracy and Active Citizenship: Case Study of Bosnia and Herzegovina for North America.

Political views and engagements
Dr. Pavlović was the founding member of Movement for Changes (PzP), the Montenegrin political party, and was also the member of the Advisory Councils for Democratic Front (DF), a political coalition in Montenegro.

Published works
Beside authoring articles in various peer-review journals worldwide, Pavlović has written historical monographs in English and Serbo-Croatian languages, such as:
 Balkan Anschluss: The Annexation of Montenegro and the Creation of the Common South Slavic State (2008); *Prostori Identiteta: Eseji o Istoriji, Sjećanju i Interpretacijama Prošlosti (2006); 
Iza Ogledala: Eseji o Politici Identiteta (2004); 
Zapadna Ljuljaška (1997); 
Mongolski Piktogram (1989).

He edited scholarly collections and literary anthologies such as:
 Transcending Fratricide: Political Myths, Reconciliations and the Uncertain Future in the former Yugoslavia (2013); 
Treshold: Anthology of Contemporary Writing from Alberta (1998).

See also
Marko Attila Hoare

References

External links
 Srdja Pavlović, at Twitter
 Srdja Pavlović, University of Alberta Academia.edu

Living people
Historians of the Balkans
Montenegrin historians
Serbian historians
Yugoslav emigrants to Canada
Year of birth missing (living people)